Tom Blom (25 September 1946 – 3 July 2017) was a Dutch television and radio presenter.

Career
In 1975, Blom made his television debut as an announcer at The Johnny Kraaijkamp Show. Later, he was a presenter of the record program De Eerste de Beste (together with Walter Tiemessen). From 1983, Blom was a commentator and co-presenter at Te land, ter zee en in de lucht, together with Tom Mulder and Jack van Gelder.

In 1989, he halted these activities after switching to Joop van den Ende's television channel TV10, which eventually ceased to exist due to poor ratings. In 2000, Blom returned as a commentator at Te land, ter zee en in de lucht until the show's ultimate cancellation in 2011.

Blom died on 3 July 2017 at the age of 70.

References

1946 births
2017 deaths
Dutch television presenters
Dutch radio presenters
Mass media people from The Hague